Meon Valley may refer to:

The valley of the River Meon, Hampshire, England
Meon Valley (UK Parliament constituency), constituency represented in the House of Commons of the United Kingdom's Parliament
Meon Valley Railway, cross-country railway in Hampshire, England 
Meon Valley Trail (footpath), recreational footpath in Hampshire, England

See also
Moon Valley (disambiguation)